Forest Park Parkway is a parkway in St. Louis and Clayton, Missouri that runs from Interstate 170, becomes Forest Park Avenue at Kingshighway Boulevard, and ends at Market Street and Interstate 64. It is considered an arterial snow route.

History 
The corridor began life in the 19th century as a heavy rail line used by the Wabash and Rock Island railroads. The heavy rail line was replaced with streetcars, and later, the parkway. Before 1959, Forest Park Avenue ran west from Grand Boulevard in Midtown and terminated at the eastern edge of Forest Park, at Kingshighway Boulevard. Construction on the route west of Kingshighway to the suburban community of Clayton began in 1959 in addition to an eastward expansion that extended the route to its present terminus at Market Street and Compton Avenue at I-64.

Present Day 

In 1993, MetroLink's initial light rail line opened between East St. Louis, Illinois and St. Louis-Lambert Airport. Roughly 3.2-miles (5.1 km) of this alignment runs in the historic Wabash Railroad right of way along Forest Park Parkway and adjacent to Forest Park Avenue. In 2006, the Cross County extension opened with roughly 3.4-miles (5.5 km) of track running in the Forest Park Parkway corridor between DeBaliviere Avenue to I-170. There are stations at or below intersections with DeBaliviere, Skinker Boulevard, Big Bend Boulevard, Forsyth Boulevard, and Central Avenue before the alignment turns south into the I-170 corridor.

In 2017, the city of St. Louis and BJC Healthcare opened a reconstructed at-grade interchange between Forest Park Avenue and Kingshighway Boulevard. Previously, Forest Park Avenue dipped below-grade and passed beneath Kingshighway as it entered Forest Park. Currently, the intersection with Grand Boulevard still has this underpass feature as motorists enter and exit I-64.

Major intersections

Light rail stations

References

Parkways in the United States
Transportation in St. Louis County, Missouri
Streets in St. Louis